The AN/FSQ-7 Combat Direction Central, referred to as the Q7 for short, was a computerized command and control system for Cold War ground-controlled interception used in the USAF Semi-Automatic Ground Environment (SAGE) air defense network.

The name “AN/FSQ” derives from Army-Navy / Fixed Special eQuipment.

An advancement of the pioneering MIT Whirlwind II digital computer design, and manufactured by IBM as prime contractor, the AN/FSQ-7 was the largest discrete computer system ever built. Each of the 24 installed machines weighed 250 tons. The AN/FSQ-7 used a total of 60,000 vacuum tubes (49,000 in the computers) and up to 3 megawatts of electricity, performing about 75,000 instructions per second for networking regional radars.

Primary functions
Installations in the USAF Semi-Automatic Ground Environment (SAGE) air defense network were configured as duplex systems, using a pair of AN/FSQ-7 computers to provide fault tolerance. One was active at any time, the other on standby. The standby system copied data from the active system to minimize switchover time if needed. A scheduled switchover took place every day.

The AN/FSQ-7 calculated one or more predicted interception points for assigning manned aircraft or CIM-10 Bomarc missiles to intercept an intruder using the Automatic Target and Battery Evaluation (ATABE) algorithm.  Also used in the Nike AN/FSG-1 system, ATABE automated the Whiz Wheel (Felsenthal CPU-73 A/P Air Navigation Attack Computer) method used in manual command post operations.

The Q7 fire button launched the Bomarc, and an additional Q7 algorithm automatically directed the missile during climb and cruise to the beginning of its supersonic dive on the target when guidance transferred to the missile seeker system for the homing dive.  Later improvements allowed transmission of Q7 guidance to autopilots of manned fighters for vectoring to targets via the SAGE Ground to Air Data Link Subsystem (cf. bomber vectoring to a Bomb Release Point in 1965–1973 Vietnam via vacuum-tube analog computers.)

History
The first United States radar network used voice reporting to the 1939 Twin Lights Station in New Jersey, and the post-World War II experimental Cape Cod System used a Whirlwind I computer at Cambridge, Massachusetts to network long-range and several short-range radars. The key Whirlwind modification for radar netting was the development of magnetic-core memory that vastly improved reliability, doubled operating speed, and quadrupled input speed relative to the original Williams tube memory of the Whirlwind I.

The AN/FSQ-7 was based on the larger and faster (but uncompleted) Whirlwind II design. It proved too much for MIT's resources, resulting in IBM being retained as prime contractor – though the MIT Lincoln Laboratory Division 6 still participated in AN/FSQ-7 development.

Similar to the Q7, the smaller AN/FSQ-8 Combat Control Central was produced without an Automatic Initiation Area Discriminator and other equipment.

A simplex version of the AN/FSQ-7 was located at the premises of the System Development Corporation in Santa Monica, California from 1957 until the premises were vacated some time after 1981.

Uses

SAGE

The experimental SAGE subsector, located in Lexington, Massachusetts, was completed in 1955, equipped with a prototype AN/FSQ-7 known as XD-1 in Building F.  The third evaluation run with the XD-1 was in August and the prototype was complete in October 1955, except for displays.

DC-1 at McGuire Air Force Base was the first operational site of the AN/FSQ-7 with consoles scheduled for delivery Aug–Oct 1956.  Groundbreaking at McChord Air Force Base was in 1957 where the "electronic brain" began arriving in November 1958. The Cape Canaveral BOMARC 624-XY1's intercept of a target drone in August 1958 used the Kingston, New York, Q7 1500 miles away. By 1959, the 2000th simulated BOMARC intercept had been completed by the Q7.

The SAGE/Missile Master test program conducted large-scale field testing of the ATABE mathematical model using radar tracks of actual Strategic Air Command and Air Defense Command aircraft conducting mock penetrations into defense sectors (cf. Operation Skyshield).  The vacuum-tube SAGE network was completed (and obsolete) in 1963, and a system ergonomic test was performed at Luke Air Force Base in 1964. According to Harold Sackman, it "showed conclusively that the wrong timing of human and technical operations was leading to frequent truncation of the flight path tracking system."  Back-Up Interceptor Control Systems (BUIC) were used to replace the AN/FSQ-7s: two remained at SAGE sites until 1983 including McChord AFB, and the Q7 at Luke AFB was demolished in February 1984.

Sabre
The SABRE airline reservation system used AN/FSQ-7 technology.

In popular media
Q7 components were used as props in numerous films and television series needing futuristic-looking computers, despite the fact they were built in the 1950s. Q7 components were used in The Time Tunnel, The Towering Inferno, Logan's Run, WarGames, Independence Day, Planet of the Apes TV series (Season 1, Episode 5, "The Legacy" aired October 1974), and many others.

Today
The Computer History Museum displays several AN/FSQ-7 components.

Equipment 

MIT selected IBM as the prime contractor for equipment construction.
The Central Computer System of the AN/FSQ-7 had two computers for redundancy each with Arithmetic, Core Memory, Instruction Control, Maintenance Control, Selection & IO Control, and Program elements.  The Q7 had input/output devices such as:
 IBM 723 card punch and IBM 713 punched card reader
 IBM 718 line printer (64 print positions)
 drum auxiliary memory (50 "fields" of 2048 words each) and IBM 728 magnetic tape drives (32-bit words)
 Crosstelling Input (XTL) from other AN/FSQ sites
 Display and Warning Light System with dozens of consoles in various rooms having Situation Display Tubes, Digital Display Tubes, and controls (e.g., push buttons and light gun) including:
 Duplex Maintenance Console (two), each DMC operated one of the Central Computer Systems and allowed diagnostics (a speaker was available)
 Tracker Initiator Consoles for designating a "blip" (radar return) to be tracked (assign a track number and to relay speed, direction, and altitude)
 Command Post Digital Display Desk
 Senior Director's keyed console with the Bomarc fire button
 LRI Monitor Console for monitoring Long Range Radar data
 Large Board Projection Equipment Operator displays were directly copied on 35 mm film which were projected on the board.

Punched card data was transferred to and from the core memory as binary images. Only the rightmost 64 columns were transferred, with each row containing two 32-bit words. (The left columns could be punched using a special instruction.) Data were transferred to the line printer as a card image as well.

Core memory element

The FSQ-7 and -8 used core memory with 32-bit words plus a parity bit, operating at a 6-microsecond cycle time. Both machines had two banks of memory, memory 1 and memory 2 (Commonly referred to as Big Mem and little Mem). On the FSQ 7 memory 1 had 65,536 words and memory 2 had 4096 words. At Luke Air Force Base, the FSQ-7 held 65,536 words at each bank and the FSQ-8 4096 words at each bank.

For data storage, each word was divided into two halves, each half was a 15-bit number with a sign bit. Arithmetic operations were performed on both halves simultaneously. Each number was treated as a fraction between −1 and 1. This restriction is placed on data primarily so that the multiplication of two numbers will always result in a product smaller than either of the numbers, thus positively avoiding overflow. Properly scaling calculations was the responsibility of the programmer.

Instructions used the right half word plus the left sign bit to form addresses, yielding a 17-bit address space. The remainder of the left half word specified the operation. The first three bits after the sign specified an index register. The following bits specified an instruction class, class variation and instruction-dependent auxiliary information. Addresses were written in octal notation, with the two sign bits forming a prefix, so 2.07777 would be the highest word in memory 2.

Arithmetic registers were provided for both halves of the data word and included an accumulator, an A register that held the data value retrieved from memory, and a B register that held the least significant bits of a multiplication, the magnitude of a division, as well as shifted bits. There was also a program counter, four index registers, and a 16-bit real-time clock register which was incremented 32 times a second.  Trigonometric sine and cosine functions used 1.4 degree precision (256 values) via look-up tables.

See also
List of vacuum-tube computers

References

1955 in computing
1955 in military history
1958 in military history
1983 disestablishments
1983 in military history
Cold War military computer systems of the United States
IBM vacuum tube computers
Equipment of the United States Air Force
Missile guidance
AN/FSQ-7